John Scott Sherrill is an American songwriter whose work is primarily in the field of country music. His brother, Donn Sherrill, was a Vanderbilt student.  He introduced John Scott to his fraternity brother, Scott Siman who recorded demos of his music.  He pitched the music to Bob Beckham at Combine Music, and Beckham signed him to a worldwide publishing deal. He also got a record deal with Portrait Records in the early 1980’s and released a few solo singles of his own.

He has written songs for such artists as John Anderson, Brooks & Dunn, Jimmy Buffett, Johnny Lee, George Strait, Steve Wariner, Patty Loveless, Josh Turner, Waylon Jennings, Alison Krauss, Peter Wolf, Mick Jagger, Michael McDonald and Willie Nelson and Kris Kristofferson.  He is the son of Christian writers John and Elizabeth Sherrill. In the 1980s, Sherrill recorded on Reprise Records with Bob DiPiero and Dennis Robbins as the band Billy Hill.

Discography

Singles

References

External links
http://www.bmi.com/news/entry/335087

American country songwriters
Living people
Musicians from Nashville, Tennessee
Year of birth missing (living people)